Guanoxabenz is a metabolite of guanabenz.

References

Alpha-2 adrenergic receptor agonists
Chloroarenes
Guanidines